Artistic billiards, sometimes called fantasy billiards or fantaisie classique, is a carom billiards discipline in which players compete at performing 76 preset shots of varying difficulty. Each set shot has a maximum point value assigned for perfect execution, ranging from a four-point maximum for lowest level difficulty shots, and climbing to an 11-point maximum for shots deemed highest in difficulty level. There are a total of 500 points available to a player, representing the combined value of a perfect score on all 76 shots, although not all games are played with the full shot catalogue. The governing body of the sport is the Confédération International de Billard Artistique (CIBA).

Each shot in an artistic billiards match is played from a well-defined position (in some venues within a  two millimetre tolerance), and each shot must unfold in an established manner. Players are allowed three attempts at each shot. In general, the shots making up the game – even four-point shots – require a high degree of skill, devoted practice and specialized knowledge to perform.

Players may use up to twenty separate cues providing different performance functions. For example, performing massés may require a cue with a very large diameter terminus and a specialized , while jumping may require a short,  with a flat (rather than rounded), very hard and also wider cue tip than a playing cue. For the most part, top artistic billiard players specialize in the game to the exclusion of all others.

World title competition first started in 1986 and required the use of ivory balls. However, this requirement was dropped in 1990. The highest score ever achieved in world competition was 374, by the Frenchman Jean Reverchon in 1992, while the highest score in competition overall is 427 set by the Belgian Walter Bax in 2006. The game is played predominantly in Western Europe, especially in France, Belgium and the Netherlands. The game employs a specialized vocabulary, chiefly derived from French words, encompassing many terms that have no analogues in other cue sports disciplines. Some examples are coup fouetté ("whip shot"; a type of force follow); massé coulé (a massé shot with follow) and piqué (describes either a massé shot with no english, or a shot in which the cue stick is steeply angled, but not held quite as vertical as it is in full massé).

Artistic pool

Artistic pool trick shot competitions on pocket billiards tables, inspired by artistic billiards, began in 1993 in the US at an amateur level and in 2000 professionally and internationally, featuring fifty-six pre-set shots to attempt, with the World Pool-Billiard Association sanctioning body creating the WPA World Artistic Pool Championship.

References

Martin Škrášek (2000). What's Artistic Billiard?. Retrieved November 30, 2006.

External links
Confédération International de Billard Artistique, the governing body of the sport
Three-time world champion Jean Reverchon's website
Juanjo Trilles Cup of Creative Artistic Billiard

 
Trick shots
Carom billiards